Berkel-Enschot is a planned railway station between 's-Hertogenbosch and Tilburg.

A station operated here on the Tilburg–Nijmegen railway between 1881 and 1938. There were plans to reopen a station to relieve stress on other lines, but the motion was rejected in 2010. On 28 November 2014 it was announced that the station would certainly not be built before 2028.

References

Defunct railway stations in the Netherlands
Proposed railway stations in the Netherlands